Byron F. Wackett (March 21, 1912 – May 17, 1980) was a member of the Wisconsin State Assembly.

Biography
Wackett was born on March 21, 1912 in Randolph, Wisconsin.

Career
Wackett served in the Assembly from 1953 to 1976. Previously, he had been mayor of Watertown, Wisconsin. Wackett operated a service station. He was a Republican. Wackett died on May 17, 1980.

References

People from Randolph, Wisconsin
Politicians from Watertown, Wisconsin
Businesspeople from Wisconsin
Mayors of places in Wisconsin
Republican Party members of the Wisconsin State Assembly
1912 births
1980 deaths
20th-century American businesspeople
20th-century American politicians